Mount Haven Hotel is a hotel near the coast on the eastern side of the town of Marazion, Cornwall, England, UK, several miles east of Penzance. It is next to Chymorvah House and has panoramic views of St Michael's Mount and bay.

The hotel's restaurant has been awarded an AA Rosette and in the summer tables are put out on the terrace which overlooks St Michael's Mount.

References

External links

Official site

Hotels in Cornwall
Marazion